Steven Sadettin Saran (born 30 August 1964) is a Turkish athlete, businessman and sports executive and candidate for presidency of Fenerbahçe SK.

Biography 
He was born on 30 August 1964 in Denver, Colorado. He studied Mechanical Engineering at the University of Kentucky in the United States. Saran, who later came to Turkey, worked at the Ministry of Culture and Tourism. Later, he founded Saran Holding and assumed the representation of many well-known world brands. Between 1990 and 1995, he served as Assistant General Manager and General Manager at Martin Marietta's Ankara Office. While he was studying in the US, he was the team captain of the school's swimming team and was selected as the Most Valuable Athlete for two years. He was the captain of the Turkish National Swimming Team in 1984–1985 and broke the 50-meter freestyle swimming record during this period. Saran, who was a shareholder of Borussia Dortmund, one of the Bundesliga teams, sold his shares after the racist and Islamaphobic reactions from the fans. Saran, who has a daughter named Lal from a previous marriage, speaks Spanish and intermediate German as well as English. Media organizations such as S Sport, Radyospor, Radyo Music, Radyo Traffic, Ajansspor sports portal and tuttur.com betting site also belong to Sadettin Saran.

References 

Living people
1964 births